Goslar (Eastphalian: Goslär) is a historic town in Lower Saxony, Germany. It is the administrative centre of the district of Goslar and located on the northwestern slopes of the Harz mountain range. The Old Town of Goslar and the Mines of Rammelsberg are UNESCO World Heritage Sites for their millenium-long testimony to the history of ore mining and their political importance for the Holy Roman Empire and Hanseatic League. Each year Goslar awards the Kaiserring to an international artist, called the "Nobel Prize" of the art world.

Geography

Geographically, Goslar forms the boundary between the Hildesheim Börde which is part of the Northern German Plain, and the Harz range, which is the highest, northernmost extension of Germany's Central Uplands. The Hildesheim Börde is characterised by plains with rich clay soils – used agriculturally for sugar beet farming – interlaced with several hill ranges commonly known as the Hildesheim Forest and Salzgitter Hills. In the northeast the Harly Forest stretches down to the River Oker, in the east, Goslar borders on the German state of Saxony-Anhalt.

Extended forests dominate the landscape. The major rivers crossing the municipal boundaries are the Oker with its Gose/Abzucht and Radau tributaries. At the northern foot of the Herzberg it meets the smaller Abzucht stream, before it flows into the Oker. The Dörpke and Gelmke streams also flow from the Harz foothills to the south into the Goslar municipal area, where they discharge into the Abzucht.

Neighbouring municipalities
(clockwise from the North): Liebenburg, Schladen-Werla (Wolfenbüttel District), Osterwieck (Harz District, Saxony-Anhalt), Bad Harzburg, Clausthal-Zellerfeld (Oberharz), and Langelsheim.

Town districts
The township currently comprises 18 districts (Stadtteile):

Climate

History

Iron ore mining was common in the Harz region since Roman times; the earliest known evidences for quarrying and smelting date back to the 3rd century AD. Ancient burial objects made of Harz ore have even been discovered during excavations in England. The settlement on the Gose creek was first mentioned in a 979 deed issued by Emperor Otto II; it was located in the Saxon homelands of the Ottonian dynasty and probably a royal palace already existed at the site. It became even more important when extensive silver deposits were discovered at the nearby Rammelsberg, today a mining museum.

When Otto's descendant Henry II began to convene Imperial synods at the Goslar palace from 1009 onwards, Goslar gradually replaced the Royal palace of Werla as a central place of assembly in the Saxon lands; a development that was again enforced by the Salian ("Franconian") emperors. Conrad II, once elected King of the Romans, celebrated Christmas 1024 in Goslar and had the foundations laid for the new Imperial Palace the next year.

Goslar became the favourite residence of Conrad's son Henry III who stayed at the palace about twenty times. Here he received King Peter of Hungary as well as the emissaries of Prince Yaroslav of Kiev, here he appointed bishops and dukes. His son and successor Henry IV was born here on 11 November 1050. Henry also had Goslar Cathedral erected and consecrated by Archbishop Herman of Cologne in 1051; shortly before his death in 1056, Emperor Henry III met with Pope Victor II in the church, emphasizing the union of secular and ecclesiastical power. His heart was buried in Goslar, his body in the Salian family vault in Speyer Cathedral. Of the cathedral only the northern porch survived; the main building was torn down in the early 19th century.

Under Henry IV, Goslar remained a centre of Imperial rule; however, conflicts intensified such as in the violent Precedence Dispute at Pentecost 1063. While Henry aimed to secure the enormous wealth deriving from the Rammlesberg silver mines as a royal demesne, the dissatisfaction of local nobles escalated with the Saxon Rebellion in 1073–75. In the subsequent Great Saxon Revolt, the Goslar citizens sided with anti-king Rudolf of Rheinfelden, who held a princely assembly here in 1077, and with Hermann of Salm, who was crowned king in Goslar by Archbishop Siegfried of Mainz on 26 December 1081. brought Goslar the status of an Imperial City.

In Spring 1105 Henry V convened the Saxon estates at Goslar, to gain support for the deposition of his father Henry IV. Elected king in the following year, he held six Imperial Diets at the Goslar Palace during his rule. The tradition was adopted by his successor Lothair II and even by the Hohenstaufen rulers Conrad III and Frederick Barbarossa. After his election in 1152, King Frederick appointed the Welf duke Henry the Lion Imperial Vogt (bailiff) of the Goslar mines; nevertheless, the dissatisfied duke besieged the town and at an 1173 meeting in Chiavenna demanded his enfeoffment with the estates in turn for his support on Barbarossa's Italian campaigns. When Henry the Lion was finally declared deposed in 1180, he had the Rammelsberg mines devastated.

Goslar's importance as an Imperial residence began to decline under the rule of Barbarossa's descendants. During the German throne dispute the Welf king Otto IV laid siege to the town in 1198 but had to yield to the forces of his Hohenstaufen rival Philip of Swabia. Goslar was again stormed and plundered by Otto's troops in 1206. Frederick II held the last Imperial Diet here; with the Great Interregnum upon his death in 1250, Goslar's Imperial era ended.

While the Emperors withdraw from Northern Germany, civil liberties in Goslar were strengthened. Market rights date back to 1025; a municipal council was first mentioned in 1219. The citizens strived for control of the Rammelsberg silver mines and in 1267 joined the Hanseatic League. Beside mining in the Upper Harz, commerce and trade in Gose beer, later also slate and vitriol, became important. By 1290 the council had obtained  rights, confirming Goslar's status as a free imperial city. In 1340 its citizens were vested with  rights by Emperor Louis the Bavarian. The Goslar town law set an example for numerous other municipalities, like the Goslar mining law codified in 1359.

Early modern times saw both a mining boom and rising conflicts with the Welf Dukes of Brunswick-Lüneburg, mainly with Prince Henry V of Wolfenbüttel who seized the Rammelsberg mines and extended Harz forests in 1527. Goslar was temporarily placed under Imperial ban, while the Protestant Reformation was introduced in the city by theologian Nicolaus von Amsdorf who issued a first church constitution in 1531. To assert independence, the citizens in 1536 joined the Schmalkaldic League against the Catholic policies of the Habsburg emperor Charles V. The Schmalkaldic forces indeed occupied the Wolfenbüttel lands of Henry V, however, when they were defeated by Imperial forces at the 1547 Battle of Mühlberg, the Welf duke continued his reprisals.

In 1577 the Goslar citizens signed the Lutheran Formula of Concord. After years of continued skirmishes, they finally had to grant Duke Henry and his son Julius extensive mining rights which ultimately edged out the city council. Nevertheless, several attempts by the Brunswick dukes to incorporate the Imperial city were rejected. Goslar and its economy was hit hard by the Thirty Years' War, mainly by the  financial crisis in the 1620s which led to several revolts and pogroms. The city was occupied by the Swedish forces of King Gustavus Adolphus from 1632 to 1635; in 1642 a peace agreement was reached between Emperor Ferdinand III and the Brunswick duke Augustus the Younger. The hopes of the Goslar citizens to regain the Rammelsberg mines were not fulfilled.

Goslar remained loyal to the Imperial authority, solemnly celebrating each accession of a Holy Roman Emperor. While strongly referring to its great medieval traditions, the city continuously decreased in importance and got into rising indebtedness. When  stayed at Goslar in 1777, he called it "an Imperial city rotted in and with its privileges". 
In the winter of 1798, the coldest of the century, the young English poet William Wordsworth stayed in the city. To dispel homesickness he started to write a few verses about his childhood, which would eventually evolve into the masterpiece that was published in 13 volumes after his death as The Prelude.

First administrative reforms were enacted by councillors of the Siemens family. Nevertheless, the status of Imperial immediacy was finally lost, when Goslar was annexed by Prussian forces during the Napoleonic Wars in 1802, confirmed by the German Mediatisation the next year. Under Prussian rule, further reforms were pushed ahead by councillor Christian Wilhelm von Dohm. Temporarily part of the Kingdom of Westphalia upon the Prussian defeat at the 1806 Battle of Jena–Auerstedt, Goslar finally was assigned to the newly established Kingdom of Hanover by resolution of the Vienna Congress. The cathedral was sold and torn down from 1820 to 1822, bitterly mourned by Heinrich Heine in his  travelogue. Again under Prussian rule after the Austro-Prussian War of 1866, Goslar became a popular retirement residence (Pensionopolis) and a garrison town of the Prussian Army. The Hohenzollern kings and emperors had the Imperial Palace restored, including the mural paintings by Hermann Wislicenus.

After the Nazi seizure of power in 1933, Reich Minister Richard Walther Darré made Goslar the seat of the agricultural  corporation. In the course of the German re-armament, a  airbase was built north of the town and several war supplier companies located in the vicinity, including subcamps of the Buchenwald and Neuengamme concentration camps. Nevertheless, the historic town escaped strategic bombing during World War II.

Part of the British occupation zone from 1945, Goslar was the site of a displaced persons camp. During the Cold War era the city near the inner German border was a major garrison town for the West German army and the border police. After the fall of the Berlin wall, the barracks were vacated and a major economic factor was lost. The Rammelberg mines were finally closed in 1988, after a millennial history of mining.

In the summer of 2018, a bottled typewritten message dated March 26, 1930 was discovered in the roof of Goslar Cathedral, signed by four roofers who bemoaned the economic state of that country. The bottle was discovered by a roofer who was the grandson of one of the signatories, who had been an 18-year-old roofing apprentice in 1930. Goslar's mayor replaced the bottle with a copy of the 1930 message, adding his own confidential message.

Demographics
As of 31 December 2020 there were 50,184 inhabitants in Goslar (including Vienenburg).

(count: December 31 of each year)

Politics

Town council
For the legislature from 1 November 2016 until 31 October 2021, the seats were allocated as follows:
 SPD: 14 seats (37.55%)
 CDU: 10 seats (26.10%)
 AfD: 3 seats (9.28%)
 FDP: 3 seats (6.95%)
 Greens: 3 seats (6.70%)
 Goslarer Linke: 2 seats (5.36%)
 BGL: 2 seats (5.02%)
 AfG: 1 seat (1.69%)

Lord Mayor
Dr Oliver Junk was Mayor from September 2011 through October 2021. Since November 2021 Urte Schwerdtner (SPD) is Mayor of Goslar.

Members of Parliament
 European (Constituency: Southern Lower Saxony), Godelieve Quisthoudt-Rowohl (CDU), Erika Mann (SPD)
 Bundestag (Constituency 52: Goslar, Northeim, Osterode), First: Wilhelm Priesmeier (SPD), List: Hans Georg Faust (CDU)
 Landtag Lower Saxony (Constituency 16: Goslar), First: Petra Emmerich-Kopatsch (SPD), List: Dorothee Prüssner (CDU)

Twin towns – sister cities

Goslar is twinned with:

 Arcachon, France (1965)
 Beroun, Czech Republic (1989)
 Brzeg, Poland (2000)
 Forres, Scotland, UK (1984)
 Ra'anana, Israel (2006)
 Windsor and Maidenhead, England, UK (1969)

Culture and sights

 Memorial to the fallen riflemen of the 10th Hanover Rifle Battalion in the Franco-Prussian War 1870/1871 (now at the Kahnteich)
 Memorial to the fallen riflemen of the 10th Hanover Rifle Battalion in World War I 1914-1918

Theatre
The Odeon Theatre is the town's major theatre venue. It has been recently refurbished. It is host to several productions of visiting theatre companies and music groups.

The alternative theatre Culture Power Station Harz or Kulturkraftwerk Harz is housed in a disused power station. Being run by volunteers, it produces contemporary theatre, comedy and hosts mostly alternative cultural events. Here the annual Goslar Fringe Culture Days are held from the start to mid June.

Museums
 Museum and visitor's mine Rammelsberg, an Anchor Point of ERIH, The European Route of Industrial Heritage
 Museum in the Kaiserpfalz, a 19c reconstruction of the medieval imperial palace
 Monks' House, Mönchehaus Museum for Contemporary and Modern Arts
 Goslar Museum
 Museum in the Gothic Town Hall
 Zwinger Tower and Dungeon, Museum for Late Mediaeval History

Religion

 Protestant-Lutheran
 Congregation Marktkirche, Market Church (build 1151, North Tower mountable)
 Congregation Neuwerk, Newark Church
 Congregation St Stephani, Saint Stephen
 Congregation Zum Frankenberge, Frankenberg Church
 Congregation Gustav-Adolf-Stabkirche, Gustav Adolf stave church in Hahnenklee
 Congregation Martin-Luther-Kirche, Martin Luther Church
 Congregation St Paulus Kirche, St Paul's Church, in Oker
 Congregation St Georg, St George
 Congregation St Johannes, St John
 Parish Church St Kilian in Hahndorf
 Congregation St Lukas, St Luke
 Parish Church St Matthäus, St Matthew's, in Jerstedt
 Congregation St Peter
  Baptist
 Congregation Christuskirche, Church of Christ
 Roman Catholic
 Congregation St Jakobi, St James the Greater (built in 1073, Goslar's oldest romanesque church still in use)
 Congregation Maria Schnee, St Mary of the Snows, in Hahnenklee
 Congregation St Barbara (part of St James)
 Congregation St Konrad, St Conrad (part of St James) in Oker
 Congregations Ss Benno & George
 Abbey St George
 Islamic Faith
 Mosque of the Turkish-German Society
 Goslar Mosque

Sports
Situated at the foot of the Harz hills, Goslar offers a great deal of outdoor pursuit, from swimming to rock climbing; from motor sports and aviation to sailing and cross-country biking.

The oldest and most traditional sports club is the MTV Goslar (founded in 1849). Its main facilities, a football pitch and gymnasium are located at the Golden Meadow (Goldene Aue) site.

The football department of Goslarer SC 08 earned the right to play in the fourth division Regionalliga Nord in 2009-10 after winning the Oberliga Niedersachsen championship.

Celebrations and Events
In the year 2006 Goslar hosted the Salier Year to celebrate the foundation of this ancient German Imperial dynasty a millennium ago.

Other events include:
 Annual award (since 1975) of the "Imperial Ring" to a personality who has made an outstanding contribution to society and the arts. Its laureates include Henry Moore, Joseph Beuys, Christo, Dani Karavan etc.
 Goslar International Concerto Days, Mid to End August
 The Goslar Fair, Beginning to Mid July
 Annual Artisans market in the old town, usually beginning of August
 Old Town Festival, mid-September
 Hanseatic Days, Spring (usually during the Easter holidays)

Economy and infrastructure

The town centre of Goslar serves as a regional shopping centre to the Northern Harz region. Here department stores, several supermarkets, elegant boutiques and restaurants can be found. Once weekly, there is also a market, where farmers sell their local produce. There are also several car dealerships in the borough, some of whom specialise in either discount/reimport or custom car sales.

The tourism sector is a booming sector in Goslar. Several hotels and bed and breakfasts are located in or near the town's centre. In addition, the town has become a popular resort for the elderly and there are many care homes in the town.

Goslar has become a popular conference venue. The Achtermann Hotel and the Kaiserpfalz are popular conference centres, host to the annual German Road & Transport Tribunal Days: the Deutscher Verkehrsgerichtstag

Largest employers in Goslar are H.C. Starck (chemistry company), the tourism sector, and the civil service. Many residents of Goslar commute to Salzgitter, where car production, steel works and white collar jobs are based.

The Dr.-Herbert-Nieper-Krankenhaus is a privately owned hospital of the Asklepios Harzkliniken group serving the greater Harz region. A new annex for intensitive medicine is under construction. There are several general practitioners, dentists, and specialist practitioners distributed across the town. There is an emergency service in place.

Transport
Goslar has excellent road links, as well as rail links connecting it to the major European population centres. Goslar also serves as a major transport hub for the Upper Harz mountains (highest peak at 1,141 m (3,744 ft) altitude).

With the A 7 and the A 395 there are two main Autobahns/Highways within 20 minutes reach of Goslar.
The A 7 connects Hamburg/Hanover in the North to Frankfurt/Munich in the South. The A 2 connects Berlin – to the East – to the Ruhr Area and the Netherlands in the West. The Federal highways B 6 and B 82 converge at Goslar and are routed via the four-lane by-pass past the town centre. The B 6 is mostly four-laned and approaches Goslar via the scenic Hildesheim–Salzgitter route.

Goslar is served by the German Railway network (Deutsche Bahn) lines Hanover–Goslar–Halle (Saxony-Anhalt) as well as Brunswick–Goslar–Kreiensen. The central railway station is located in the vicinity of the town centre. There is a park-and-ride system for commuters to Brunswick and Hanover.

At the railway station there is a central bus station with buses travelling routinely to various destinations in the Harz mountains. The buses are from DB Stadtverkehr.

Media
The regional newspaper is the Goslar Chronicle Goslarsche Zeitung, which has an estimated daily readership of 90,000. The General-Anzeiger is a gazette owned by the Heinrich Bauer publishing group with an editorial office in Goslar. Aside from this there are two freely distributed gazettes.

Radio Okerwelle GoslarRadio is the regional private radio station based in Brunswick, which broadcasts contemporary music, information and news in the German language to the Brunswick region.

Education
The three tier education system in Goslar district falls under Lower-Saxon legislation. The language of instruction at all schools is German. The nine primary schools are distributed across the entire municipality and the associated hamlets. There are two advanced secondary schools (5-12/13), the Christian-von-Dohm-Gymnasium, and the more traditional Ratsgymnasium, both of which prepare their students for an academic career. Three intermediate level schools (5-10), the Andre-Mouton Realschule, the Realschule Hoher Weg, and the Realschule Goldene Aue prepare their pupils for a professional career. Furthermore, two vocational schools (5-9/10) exist: the Hauptschule Oker, and the Hauptschule Kaiserpfalz. The Sonderschule caters to children with learning difficulties and special needs.

The supplementary public Waldorf school Harz – Branch Goslar, educates its students along a more spiritual line termed anthroposophy, which is based on the teachings of the Austrian pedagogue Rudolf Steiner.

At the 10-12 level there are four job-training colleges located at Goslar in crafts, economics, and care for the elderly for students from Goslar district and beyond. There are two public vocational schools offering part-time education within the German dual vocational education and training system and full-time education. BBS 1 Goslar -Am Stadtgarten- is focused on education in business administration, economics, health services and information and communications technology (ICT).  BBS Goslar-Baßgeige/Seesen is concentrated on education in mechanical, electrical and textile engineering; natural sciences: chemistry, physics, biology; food services, domestic science and industry and administration.

Some  to the south the highly acclaimed University of Göttingen (founded by King George II of Great Britain) is based.

The adult-education program (Volkshochschule) of the Goslar district is dedicated to lifelong learning.

Notable people

 Rudolf Bindig (born 1940), politician (SPD), Member of Bundestag 1976–2005
 Hans Colbitz (1899–1972), artist, painter, teacher at Albrecht-Duerer-Oberrealschule in Berlin-Neukoelln
 Falko Feldmann (born 1959), German biologist and phytomedicologist
 Sigmar Gabriel (born 1959), politician (SPD), Federal Minister for Foreign Affairs
 Heinz Günther Guderian (1914–2004), officer in the Wehrmacht and later Inspector of armoured mechanized artillery in the German Defence forces Bundeswehr and NATO
 Mathias Hain (born 1972), soccer player 
 Silvia Hildegard Haneklaus (* 1959), Researcher
 Henry IV, Holy Roman Emperor (1050–1106), King of Germany and Holy Roman Emperor
 Aaron Hunt (born 1986), footballer
 Ernst Jünger (1895–1998), German soldier (recipient of the Pour le Mérite decoration in World War I) and author, lived in Goslar from December 1933 to 1936. This time represented the beginning of his innere Emigration (inner emigration), distancing himself from direct political commentary, as he left Berlin following the Gestapo search of his house in April 1933
 Hermann Max (born 1941), church musician and conductor
 Albert Niemann (1834–1861), chemist and pharmacist. Credited with the discovery of cocaine
 Otto Wilhelm August Nieper (1848–1939), Chief Surgeon at the hospital in Goslar, which was renamed the Dr.-Herbert-Nieper-Krankenhaus in his honor.  
 Ernst Pistulla (1906–1944), German boxer, competed in the 1928 Summer Olympics
 Wilhelm Ripe (1818–1885), painter and graphic designer
 Maurice, comte de Saxe (1696–1750), Marshal General of France. Adversary of the Hanoverians
 Ewald Schnug (born 1954), agricultural researcher, professor, Honorary-President of the International Scientific Center for Fertilizers
 Regine Schumann (born 1961), artist, painter and light artist
 Siemens Family. The ancestral home of the Siemens family, who can count toward their more famous offspring, the Prussian-British-Russian industrial pioneers Werner von Siemens, Sir William Siemens and Carl von Siemens, is in Goslar
 Rudolf Sprung (1925–2015), politician (CDU), Member of Bundestag 1969–1994
 Henning von Tresckow (1901–1944), German military officer and leading anti-Hitler conspirator, was a student at the Goslar Realgymnasium (now Ratsgymnasium Goslar) from 1913 until 1917, when he left to join the army. He boarded in a private home near the school since his own home was far away
 Thomas Wallner (born 1961), consultant (SAP), Ambassador for Martinique
 Phylicia Whitney (Born 1950), journalist and public speaker
 Dieter Zechlin (1926–2012), pianist

References

External links

Mines of Rammelsberg, Historic Town of Goslar and Upper Harz Water Management System UNESCO Official Website

 Official website 

 Sound and video of Marktplatz clock
 Pictures of Goslar (German website)

 
World Heritage Sites in Germany
Members of the Hanseatic League
Landmarks in Germany
Free imperial cities
Mining communities in Germany